Natural Wonder is a live album by American musician Stevie Wonder, released in 1995 and recorded in Osaka, Japan and Tel Aviv, Israel. The tour featured different symphony orchestras at some venues, conducted by touring conductor Henry Panion III. It is his fourth live album after Recorded Live: The 12 Year Old Genius (1963), Stevie Wonder Live (1970), and Live at the Talk of the Town (also 1970).

Content 
The album comprises songs from throughout his career, spanning 1969's My Cherie Amour to 1995's Conversation Peace, in addition to the debut of three new songs - "Dancing to the Rhythm", the Stevie Ray Vaughan tribute "Stevie Ray Blues", and "Ms. & Mr. Little Ones". Wonder also performs "Stay Gold", a song he sang and co-write with composer Carmine Coppola for Coppola's score to The Outsiders.

Track listing

Disc one
 "Dancing to the Rhythm" – 7:07
 "Love's in Need of Love Today" – 6:02
 "Master Blaster (Jammin')" – 3:36
 "Stevie Ray Blues" – 2:27
 "Higher Ground" – 3:59
 "Rocket Love" – 4:47
 "Stay Gold" – 4:21
 "Ribbon in the Sky" – 8:37
 "Pastime Paradise" – 3:22
 "If It's Magic" – 3:34
 "Ms. & Mr. Little Ones" – 4:17
 "Village Ghetto Land" – 3:26
 "Tomorrow Robins Will Sing" – 4:20

Disc two
 "Overjoyed" – 3:59
 "My Cherie Amour" – 3:20
 "Signed, Sealed, Delivered, I'm Yours" – 2:45
 "Living for the City" – 4:26
 "Sir Duke" – 2:46
 "I Wish" – 4:06
 "You Are the Sunshine of My Life" – 2:21
 "Superstition" – 5:37
 "I Just Called to Say I Love You" – 4:38
 "For Your Love" – 5:06
 "Another Star" – 5:55

Personnel 
 Stevie Wonder – vocals, keyboards, grand piano, harmonica

Band
 Herman Jackson – keyboards
 Isaiah Sanders – keyboards
 Rick Zunigar – guitars
 Nathan Watts – bass, musical director
 Gerry Brown – drums
 Munyungo Jackson – percussion
 Keith John – backing vocals
 Panzie Johnson – backing vocals 
 Marva King – backing vocals

Orchestra
 Tokyo Philharmonic Orchestra
 Paul Riser – orchestrations and arrangements
 Dr. Henry Panion, III – conductor
 Fredrick Charley – orchestra librarian
 Steve Torok – orchestra librarian

Production 
 Stevie Wonder – producer, arrangements
 Peter Edmonds – production manager
 George Packer – production manager
 Danny Leake – recording engineer, FOH engineer
 Tohru "Kiku" Kikuchi – system engineer
 Gary Adante – editing, mixing
 Robert A. Arbittier – editing, mixing
 Chris Bellman – mastering at Bernie Grundman Mastering (Hollywood, California)
 Brian O'Neal – liner notes
 Jackie Salway – art direction, design
 James Minchin III – photography
 David Safian – photography
 Eddie Wolfl – photography

References

1995 live albums
Stevie Wonder live albums
Motown live albums
Albums produced by Stevie Wonder